The 2020–21 season was Palermo Football Club's first season in Serie C, the third tier of Italian football, following promotion from Serie D during the 2019–20 season. Palermo returned to the third division after 19 years, having last played in Serie C1 in 2000–01.

Staff 
Management Staff
 Chairman: Dario Mirri
 CEO: Rinaldo Sagramola
 General Secretary: Giuseppe Li Vigni
 Sporting Director: Renzo Castagnini
 Youth Teams Manager: Rosario Argento, then Leandro Rinaudo
 Team Manager & Press Officer: Andrea Siracusa
 Event Manager: Antonino Lentini
 Security Officer: Francesco Meli
 Marketing Manager: Gaetano Lombardo
 Merchandising Manager: Riccardo Montesanto
 Social Media Manager: Marco Sirchia

Technical Staff
 Head coach: Roberto Boscaglia (until 27 February 2021), then Giacomo Filippi (from 27 February 2021)
 Assistant Head coach: Giacomo Filippi (until 27 February 2021), then Fabio Levacovich (from 10 March 2021)
 Assistant coach: Emanuele Lupo
 Goalkeeper coach: Michele Marotta
 Personal trainers: Marco Nastasi, Marco Petrucci

Players

Squad information
Players and squad numbers last updated on 24 April 2021.Appearances and goals include domestic leagues (Serie A, Serie B, Serie C and Serie D), national and league cups (Coppa Italia and Coppa Italia Serie D), international cup (UEFA Cup) and other competitions (Promotion play-offs) and correct as of 26 May 2021.Note: Flags indicate national team as has been defined under FIFA eligibility rules. Players may hold more than one non-FIFA nationality.

Transfers

Summer 2020

In

Out

Post-summer transfers

In

Winter 2021

In

Out

Total expenditure: Undisclosed

Total revenue: €0

Net income: Unknown

Competitions

Overall

Serie C Group C

League table

Results summary

Results by round

Note
In order to preserve chronological evolvements, any postponed matches are not included to the round at which they were originally scheduled, but added to the full round they were played immediately afterwards.

Matches

Play-offs

First national round

Appearances and goals

|-
! colspan=14 style=background:pink; text-align:center| Goalkeepers
|-

|-
! colspan=14 style=background:pink; text-align:center| Defenders
|-

|-
! colspan=14 style=background:pink; text-align:center| Midfielders

|-
! colspan=14 style=background:pink; text-align:center| Forwards

|}

Goalscorers

Clean sheets

Disciplinary record

References

Palermo F.C. seasons
Palermo